The Purdue Boilermakers basketball team is a men's college basketball program that competes in NCAA Division I and is a member of the Big Ten Conference. 

Purdue basketball holds the most Big Ten regular season championships, with 25. Purdue also holds a winning record against all other Big Ten schools in head-to-head match ups.

The Boilermakers have reached two NCAA Tournament Final Fours and one championship game, but have not won an NCAA Championship. The 1931–32 team was retroactively named a national champion by the Helms Athletic Foundation and the Premo-Porretta Power Poll. 

Purdue has sent more than 30 players to the NBA, including two overall No. 1 picks in the NBA draft. 
Purdue has one main rivalry against the Indiana Hoosiers (see Indiana–Purdue Rivalry).

History

1896–1916: The early years 

The history of Purdue basketball dates back to 1896 with their first game against the Lafayette YMCA. In the 1902–03 season, head coach C.I. Freeman, in his only season, led them to an undefeated 8–0 record. Upon conclusion of the season, the university recognized the popularity of the sport and made it part of the Purdue University Athletic Association. The Boilermakers began play in the Big Ten Conference three years later, with its first championship coming in 1911 under the direction of Ralph Jones.

1917–1946: Ward Lambert era 

In 1917, Ward "Piggy" Lambert, a former basketball player at Wabash College, was named head coach of the Boilermakers. What followed was one of the most dominant eras of Purdue Basketball on the conference and national level. Under Lambert, Purdue became a front-runner in the development of the fast-paced game as it is today. In 28 seasons, Lambert mentored 16 All-Americans and 31 First Team All-Big Ten selections, which included the 1932 National Player of the Year John Wooden. Wooden was the first college player to be named a Consensus All-American three times. Lambert compiled a career record of 371–152, a .709 winning percentage. His 228 wins in Big Ten play have been bested by only Indiana's Bob Knight, Michigan State's Tom Izzo, and former Purdue head coach Gene Keady. Lambert won an unprecedented 11 Big Ten Championships, which Bobby Knight later tied for most in conference history. In 1943, the Helms Athletic Foundation retroactively recognized Purdue as its national champion for 1932. The Premo-Porretta Power Poll later recognized the Boilermakers as the 1932 national champion as well.

1950–1965: Ray Eddy era 

Ward Lambert announced his resignation on January 23, 1946. That same year and the year following, under new head coach Mel Taube, Purdue would win both meetings against coach John Wooden's Indiana State team. On February 24, 1947, three students were killed (one of whom died the next day) and 166 people were taken to hospitals after the 3,400-student section of the Purdue Fieldhouse collapsed during a game against Wisconsin.

Center Paul Hoffman became the only Boiler to be named a First Team-All Big Ten selection four times in 1947. With third overall-picked teammate Ed "Bulbs" Ehlers (who played for John Wooden at South Bend Central High School), the two were the first players in the program's history to be selected in the NBA draft, while Paul Hoffman became the BAA's (original title of the NBA) first player named Rookie of the Year in 1948.

After Mel Taube's four-and-a-half seasons, Ray Eddy, a former player and teammate of Wooden's under Lambert, took over as head coach. During his 15-year tenure, he coached Terry Dischinger and Dave Schellhase, both Consensus All-Americans, and Ernie Hall, the first Purdue junior college transfer and African-American player to wear a Boilermaker uniform. In 1955, his team played one of the longest games in college basketball history, lasting six overtimes in a loss to Minnesota.

1966–1979: George King era 

Over the next few decades the Boilermakers would enjoy moderate success, culminating in 1969 when they won their first conference title in 29 years and advanced to the 1969 NCAA Finals game under head coach George King and led by All-American Rick Mount, where they would fall to former Purdue great, John Wooden, and his UCLA Bruins squad. Former Los Angeles Lakers coach/general manager, Fred Schaus, who also spent time as West Virginia's head coach, took over the program after George King stepped down to become solely the school's athletic director. Schaus led the Boilermakers to the 1974 NIT Championship, becoming the first Big Ten team to capture the NIT title. In the 1978–79 season, new head coach Lee Rose introduced Purdue basketball to a new approach with a slowed-down, controlled style of play. With All-American center Joe Barry Carroll, he led them to the 1979 NIT Finals and to a 1980 NCAA Final Four appearance.

1980–2005: Gene Keady era 

In 1980, Gene Keady, the head coach of Western Kentucky and former assistant to Eddie Sutton with the Arkansas Razorbacks, was named the new head coach of the Boilermakers. Over the next 25 years, Keady led the Boilermakers to six Big Ten Championships, 17 NCAA Tournament appearances with two Elite Eights and no Final Fours. Purdue received their highest Associated Press and Coaches Poll ranking in its program's history during the 1987–88 season, where they were ranked as high as 2nd in the nation.  They would become ranked 1st in the nation during the 2021-2022 season. In 1991, Keady and assistant coach Frank Kendrick recruited Glenn Robinson, who ultimately became an All-American and Purdue's second-named National Player of the Year. A few years later, Purdue managed to recruit the program's first of several foreign players when they picked up Matt ten Dam from the Netherlands. In December 1997, Keady became Purdue's all-time winningest head coach, surpassing Lambert with his 372nd win. He also became the second-winningest coach in Big Ten history behind Indiana's Bobby Knight, against whom Keady went 21–20 in head-to-head meetings. Soon afterward, the playing surface at Mackey Arena was named Keady Court in his honor.

Many of Keady's former assistant coaches and players throughout the years have gone on to enjoy success as head coaches. Included in the Gene Keady coaching tree is current Purdue head coach Matt Painter, former St. John's head coach Steve Lavin, former Pittsburgh head coach Kevin Stallings, former Kansas State head coach Bruce Weber, former Wisconsin-Green Bay head coach Linc Darner, former UNC Charlotte head coach Alan Major, former Missouri head coach Cuonzo Martin, former Missouri State head coach and current Purdue assistant coach Paul Lusk, and former Illinois State head coach Dan Muller.

Following the 1998–99 season, the NCAA placed Purdue on two years' probation due to minor violations over recruiting, benefits, and ethics. Purdue also lost one scholarship per season for the 2000–01 and 2001–02 seasons. Most severely, Purdue assistant Frank Kendrick was found to have provided an illegal benefit to Purdue player Luther Clay, who transferred to Rhode Island after his freshman year, namely a $4,000 bank loan. Clay was found to be ineligible due to his extra benefit, so Purdue forfeited all 19 victories in which Clay played, including one win in the 1996 NCAA tournament.

2005–present: Matt Painter era 

As the Keady era came to a close in 2005, the Matt Painter era began. Painter played for Keady during the early 1990s, with Keady naming him captain in his senior year in 1993. After one season at Southern Illinois as the head coach after Bruce Weber left north for Illinois, Painter was hired as a planned replacement for Coach Keady for the 2004–05 season as Keady's associate head coach. After a disappointing first season marred with injuries and suspensions from off-court altercations, Painter re-energized Purdue basketball in the summer of 2006 by signing the top recruiting class in the conference and made one of the biggest turnarounds in the program's history. His "Baby Boilers" developed into three eventual All-Americans, including 2011 consensus selection JaJuan Johnson, that led Purdue to four consecutive NCAA Tournaments and back-to-back Sweet Sixteen appearances, a Big Ten title, and a conference tournament championship. During the 2010 season, Matt Painter led the Boilermakers to a school record-tying 14–0 start, as well with the most wins in a season with a 29–6 record and a Big Ten title. The season ended in relative disappointment, however, as Junior Robbie Hummel was sidelined with an ACL injury in February of that season.  The following year, and with the anticipated return of Hummel, E'Twaun Moore, and Johnson, Purdue looked poised to have one of its program's finest seasons.  This excitement was quickly tempered when Hummel re-tore his ACL on the first practice of the season, sidelining him for its duration once again. Despite Hummel's absence, Purdue remained in the top ten most of the season, being ranked as high as 6th and finished the regular season with a 26–8 record.  At the conclusion of the 2010–2011 season, Johnson and Moore declared for the NBA draft. On June 23, 2011, both Johnson and Moore were drafted to the Boston Celtics in the first and second rounds, respectively. Purdue began the 2012 season with a 12–3 record, holding the fifth best home winning streak in the nation with 27, before leading the nation with the fewest turnover average per game. The home winning streak was lost during the 2012 season to Alabama. They finished with a 10–8 conference record, giving Purdue its sixth consecutive 22+ win season, the best in the program's history. In the 2012 NBA draft, Robbie Hummel was the 58th overall pick by the Minnesota Timberwolves. The following two seasons brought slim success, missing out on both the NCAA Tournament and the NIT. They accepted a bid in the 2013 CBI, where they lost in the second round to Santa Clara. After a moderate 8–5 preseason campaign during the 2015 season, Purdue got back on track, finishing 3rd in the conference after finishing last the season prior. The 2015 season ended after losing to Cincinnati in overtime. It was the first time the program lost its opener in the NCAA Tournament since 1993, breaking a 14-game win streak. After making it back to the NCAA tourny, the program landed its biggest recruit in nearly a quarter century when Fort Wayne native Caleb Swanigan, a top ten recruit, de-committed from Michigan State. They opened the 2016 season with an 11–0 record, while setting a program record with consecutive double-digit victories and were ranked as high as 9th in the nation. That season ended with an NCAA First Round loss to Little Rock with a 26–9 record. In May 2016, it was announced that the 2017–18 Purdue team would represent the U.S. at the 2017 World University Games in Taipei.  The team would go on to win the Silver Medal at the Games, winning every game until losing to Lithuania in the gold medal game.

Purdue won the outright 2017 Big Ten Conference title, along with Caleb Swanigan being named unanimous B1G Player of the Year. In the 2017 NCAA Tournament, Purdue reached the Sweet Sixteen, losing to #1 seed Kansas. In the 2017–2018 season, Purdue, led by seniors Vince Edwards, Isaac Haas, PJ Thompson, Dakota Mathias and sophomore Carsen Edwards, spent several weeks at #3 while being on a program record and nation-leading 19-game winning streak. During that time, the Boilers led the nation in scoring margin, points per game, three-point shooting, and was one of only two teams with a top 3 ranking in both offensive and defensive efficiency. Purdue missed out on a consecutive B1G title after losing to Wisconsin, finishing 2nd in the conference at 15–3. The Boilers were seeded 4th in the Big Ten tournament, where they beat Rutgers and Penn State to reach the Big Ten tournament Championship for the second time in three years. They faced a familiar opponent in Michigan, whom they had already faced two other times throughout that season, Purdue winning both meetings. However, Michigan beat Purdue 75–66 to become Big Ten tournament Champions for the second straight season.

Purdue was seeded 2nd in the East Region of the 2018 NCAA Division I men's basketball tournament, their highest seed in recent history. In the first round, they faced Cal State Fullerton Titans, winning 74–48. However, many Purdue fan's hearts broke in the second half of the game, as senior Center Isaac Haas fell on his elbow as he fought for a rebound, and broke his elbow as he hit the ground, ending his Purdue Basketball career. Purdue's second round game was against Butler Bulldogs, whom Purdue had already played earlier in the season. The Boilers would win the game on a last second shot by Dakota Mathias, winning 76–73 to advance to the Sweet Sixteen for the second straight season. In the Sweet Sixteen, Purdue faced the third seeded Texas Tech Red Raiders. The Boilers would go on to lose in disappointing fashion 65–78, ending their season with 30 wins, the most wins in program history.

In 2019, Purdue was seeded 3rd in the South Region of the 2019 NCAA Division I men's basketball tournament, after another strong season. In the first round, they eliminated a 26–8 Old Dominion team that was coming off a Conference USA championship, winning 61–48. In the second round, they handily defeated #6 seed Villanova, sending the defending champs home early after an 87–61 victory, and advancing to their third straight Sweet Sixteen under Matt Painter. The Boilermakers ran into their first real test with the #2 Tennessee Volunteers. After a back and forth contest that included 17 lead changes and needed overtime to be decided, Purdue came out victorious, barely beating the Vols 99–94 to reach their first Elite Eight in nearly 20 years. In the Elite Eight, Purdue faced the #1 seeded Virginia Cavaliers in what would be another back and forth thriller. 

After several lead changes throughout the game, Purdue led 70–67 with 5.9 seconds left and looked to be headed to their first Final Four since 1980. Virginia's Ty Jerome was fouled intentionally, and missed the second free throw of two after making the first. Virginia was able to come up with the offensive rebound, and after chasing down the loose ball that had gone into the Virginia back court, toss the ball to Mamadi Diakite who hit a free-throw line floater at the buzzer to send the game to overtime tied at 70. The Boilermakers once again looked to be en route to the Final Four, leading 75–74 with 43 seconds to go. However Virginia was able to hold Purdue scoreless over the final minute and prevailed 80–75, ending the Boilermakers season with 26 wins and their first Elite Eight appearance since 2000.  

Purdue is still seeking their first Final Four under Matt Painter, and first since 1980.

Boilermaker home courts

 Mackey Arena (formerly Purdue Arena) 1967–present
 Lambert Fieldhouse (formerly Purdue Fieldhouse) 1937–1967
 Lafayette Jefferson High School Gymnasium 1929, 1934–1937
 Memorial Gymnasium 1909–1934
 Lafayette Colliseum

Current staff

Results by season (1980–present)

*Purdue forfeited 18 regular season wins (6 conference wins) and vacated 1 NCAA Tournament win and 1 NCAA Tournament loss due to use of an ineligible player for during the 1995–96 season.

Postseason

NCAA tournament results
The Boilermakers have appeared in the NCAA tournament 33 times. Their combined record is 44–33; due to use of an ineligible player, Purdue vacated one win and one loss from the 1996 NCAA Tournament, resulting in an adjusted official NCAA Tournament record of 43–32.

*Purdue vacated one win and one loss from the 1996 NCAA Tournament due to use of an ineligible player, resulting in an adjusted official NCAA Tournament record of 41–31.

NIT results
The Boilermakers have appeared in the National Invitation Tournament (NIT) eight times. Their combined record is 20–7. They were NIT champions in 1974.

CBI results
The Boilermakers have appeared in the College Basketball Invitational (CBI) one time. Their record is 1–1.

NCIT results
The Boilermakers appeared in one of the only two ever National Commissioners Invitational Tournaments. Their record is 1–1.

Awards and honors

National Awards

Consensus National Player of the Year (2)
 John Wooden (1932)
 Glenn Robinson (1994)

Sporting News Men's College Basketball Player of the Year (2)
 Glenn Robinson (1994)
 Zach Edey (2023)

UPI College Basketball Player of the Year (1)
 Glenn Robinson (1994)

Oscar Robertson Trophy (1)
 Glenn Robinson (1994)

Associated Press College Basketball Player of the Year (1)
 Glenn Robinson (1994)

Adolph Rupp Trophy (1)
 Glenn Robinson (1994)

NABC Player of the Year (1)
 Glenn Robinson (1994)

Naismith College Player of the Year (1)
 Glenn Robinson (1994)

John R. Wooden Award (1)
 Glenn Robinson (1994)

Basketball Times Player of the Year (1)
 Glenn Robinson (1994)
 Caleb Swanigan (2017)

Pete Newell Big Man Award (2)
 JaJuan Johnson (2011)
 Caleb Swanigan (2017)

Jerry West Award (1)
 Carsen Edwards (2018)

Frances Pomeroy Naismith Award (1)
 Billy Keller (1969)

Senior CLASS Award (1) 
 Robbie Hummel (2012)

National Scoring champions (2)
 Dave Schellhase (1966)
 Glenn Robinson (1994)

Naismith Memorial Basketball Hall of Fame (3)
 Ward Lambert (1960 as coach)
 Charles Murphy (1960 as player)
 John Wooden (1960 as player, 1972 as coach)

National Collegiate Basketball Hall of Fame (6)
 Ward Lambert (2006 as coach)
 Charles Murphy (2006 as player)
 John Wooden (2006 as player, 2006 as coach)
 Gene Keady (2013 as coach)
 Rick Mount (2017) as player)
 Terry Dischinger (2019 as player)

John R. Wooden Legends of Coaching Award (1)
 Gene Keady (2007)

Henry Iba Award (2)
 Gene Keady (1984, 1996)

NABC Coach of the Year (3)
 Gene Keady (1994, 2000)
 Matt Painter (2019)

All-Americans

Consensus All-American Selections (22)
 Charles "Stretch" Murphy (1929, 1930)
 John Wooden (1930, 1931, 1932)
 Norman Cottom (1934)
 Robert Kessler (1936)
 Jewell Young (1937, 1938)
 Terry Dischinger (1961, 1962)
 Dave Schellhase (1966)
 Rick Mount (1969, 1970)
 Joe Barry Carroll (1980)
 Glenn Robinson (1994)
 JaJuan Johnson (2011)
 Caleb Swanigan (2017)
 Carsen Edwards (2018, 2019)
 Jaden Ivey (2022)
 Zach Edey (2023)

Second Team All-Americans (8)
 Terry Dischinger (1960)
 Dave Schellhase (1965)
 Rick Mount (1968)
 Glenn Robinson (1993)
 Robbie Hummel (2010*)
 Carsen Edwards (2018^, 2019#)
 Jaden Ivey (2022#)
State Farm*
USA Today^
NABC#

Third Team All-Americans (8)
 Carl McNulty (1951)
 Rick Mount (1968)
 Joe Barry Carroll (1979)
 Robbie Hummel (2010*)
 E'Twaun Moore (2010**, 2011)
 Carsen Edwards (2018^, 2019^)
Fox Sports*
Yahoo.com**
The Sporting News^

Honorable Mention All-Americans (8)
 Keith Edmonson (1982)
 Steve Scheffler (1990)
 Cuonzo Martin (1995)
 Robbie Hummel (2010, 2012)
 E'Twaun Moore (2010)
 A. J. Hammons (2016)
 Zach Edey (2022)

Helms All-Americans (27)
 Dave Charters (1910, 1911)
 Lawrence Teeple (1913)
 Elmer Oliphant (1914)
 Donald White (1921)
 Ray Miller (1922)
 George Spradling (1926)
 Charles Murphy (1928, 1929, 1930)
 John Wooden (1930, 1931, 1932)
 Norman Cottom (1934)
 Emmett Lowery (1934)
 Robert Kessler (1936)
 Jewell Young (1937, 1938)
 Fred Beretta (1940)
 Paul Hoffman (1945, 1946, 1947)
 Carl McNulty (1951)
 Willie Merriweather (1959)
 Terry Dischinger (1961, 1962)
 Dave Schellhase (1966)

Academic All-American selections (11)
 Dave Schellhase (1966)
 Bob Ford (1972)
 Brian Walker (1981)
 Keith Edmonson (1982)
 Steve Reid (1983, 1984)
 Craig Riley (1992)
 Carson Cunningham (2000, 2001)
 E'Twaun Moore (2010*)
 Caleb Swanigan (2017*)
Second Team*

Big Ten Conference awards

Big Ten Player of the Year (5)
 Steve Scheffler (1990)
 Glenn Robinson (1994)
 JaJuan Johnson (2011)
 Caleb Swanigan (2017)
 Zach Edey (2023)

Chicago Tribune Silver Basketball Recipient (4)
 Rick Mount (1969, 1970)
 Jim Rowinski (1984)
 Glenn Robinson (1994)

Big Ten Coach of the Year (11)
 Gene Keady (1984, 1988, 1990, 1994, 1995, 1996, 2000)
 Matt Painter (2008, 2010, 2011, 2019)

First Team All-Big Ten (92)
 Cliff Lewis (1908)
 Dave Charters (1910, 1911)
 Ed McVaugh (1912)
 Karp Stockton (1912)
 Elmer Oliphant (1913, 1914)
 Larry Teeple (1913)
 Henry Brockenbrough (1916)
 Paul Church (1918)
 Don Tilson (1920)
 Donald White (1920, 1921)
 Ray Miller (1921, 1922)
 Blair Gullion (1922)
 George Spradling (1926)
 Wilbur Cummins (1927)
 Harold Kemmer (1928)
 Charles Murphy (1928, 1929, 1930)
 John Wooden (1930, 1931, 1932)
 Harry Kellar (1932)
 Ralph Parmenter (1933)
 Norm Cottom (1934)
 Emmet Lowery (1934)
 Robert Kessler (1935, 1936)
 Jewell Young (1937, 1938)
 Gene Anderson (1938)
 Fred Beretta (1940)
 Don Blanken (1942)
 Forrest Sprowl (1942)
 Paul Hoffman (1944, 1945, 1946, 1947)
 Howie Williams (1949, 1950)
 Carl McNulty (1952)
 Willie Merriweather (1959)
 Terry Dischinger (1960, 1961, 1962)
 Mel Garland (1963)
 Dave Schellhase (1964, 1965, 1966)
 Rick Mount (1968, 1969, 1970)
 Herm Gilliam (1969)
 Bob Ford (1972)
 Frank Kendrick (1974)
 John Garrett (1975)
 Bruce Parkinson (1975)
 Walter Jordan (1977, 1978)
 Joe Barry Carroll (1979, 1980)
 Keith Edmonson (1982)
 Russell Cross (1983)
 Jim Rowinski (1984)
 James Bullock (1985)
 Troy Lewis (1987, 1988)
 Todd Mitchell (1988)
 Steve Scheffler (1990)
 Jimmy Oliver (1991)
 Woody Austin (1992)
 Glenn Robinson (1993, 1994)
 Cuonzo Martin (1995)
 Chad Austin (1997, 1998)
 Willie Deane (2003)
 Carl Landry (2007)
 Robbie Hummel (2008, 2010, 2012)
 JaJuan Johnson (2009, 2011)
 E'Twaun Moore (2010, 2011)
 A. J. Hammons (2016)
 Caleb Swanigan (2017)
 Carsen Edwards (2018, 2019)
 Trevion Williams (2021)
 Jaden Ivey (2022)
 Zach Edey (2023)

Defensive Player of the Year (9)
 Ricky Hall (1984)
 Porter Roberts (1996)
 Kenneth Lowe (2003, 2004)
 Chris Kramer (2008, 2010)
 JaJuan Johnson (2011)
 Rapheal Davis (2015)
 A. J. Hammons (2016)

All-Freshman Team (11)
 Chris Lutz (2007)
 Robbie Hummel (2008)
 E'Twaun Moore (2008)
 Lewis Jackson (2009)
 Kelsey Barlow (2010)
 A. J. Hammons (2013)
 Kendall Stephens (2014)
 Caleb Swanigan (2016)
 Zach Edey (2021)
 Jaden Ivey (2021)
 Braden Smith (2023)

All-Defensive Team (20)
 Kenneth Lowe (2003, 2004)
 Chris Kramer (2007, 2008, 2009, 2010)
 JaJuan Johnson (2009, 2010, 2011)
 A. J. Hammons (2013, 2014, 2015, 2016)
 Rapheal Davis (2015, 2016)
 Dakota Mathias (2017, 2018)
 Nojel Eastern (2019)
 Eric Hunter Jr. (2022)
 Zach Edey (2023)

Sixth Man of the Year (2)
 D. J. Byrd (2012)
 Trevion Williams (2022)

All data taken from

Academic All-Big Ten (72)
 Dave Schellhase (1964, 1965, 1966)
 Mel Garland (1964)
 George Faerber (1970, 1971)
 Bob Ford (1972)
 Dick Satterfield (1975)
 Bruce Parkinson (1977)
 Brian Walker (1979, 1980)
 Keith Edmonson (1982)
 Steve Reid (1983, 1984, 1985)
 Curt Clawson (1983, 1984)
 Doug Lee (1984)
 Jim Rowinski (1984)
 Troy Lewis (1986)
 Dave Barrett (1989, 1990, 1991)
 John Brugos (1989)
 Craig Riley (1990, 1991, 1992)
 Todd Schoettelkotte (1991)
 Tim Ervin (1994, 1995)
 Herb Dove (1996)
 Chad Kerkhof (1997, 1998, 1999, 2000)
 Carson Cunninghom (1999, 2000, 2001)
 Andrew Ford (2002, 2003, 2004, 2005)
 Matt Carroll (2003, 2004, 2005, 2006)
 Chris Hartley (2004, 2005, 2006, 2007) 
 Matt Kiefer (2004, 2005, 2006)
 Austin Parkinson (2004)
 Brett Buscher (2004)
 Gary Ware (2005)
 Charles Davis (2005)
 Bobby Riddell (2007, 2008, 2009)
 Tarrence Crump (2008)
 Chris Kramer (2008, 2009, 2010)
 E'Twaun Moore (2009, 2010)
 Robbie Hummel (2009, 2010, 2012)
 Mark Wohlford (2010)
 Keaton Grant (2010)
 Ryne Smith (2010)

Conference Scoring champions (28)
 Dave Charters (1910)
 Henry Brockenbrough (1916)
 Donald White (1921)
 George Sprading (1924)
 Wilbur Cummins (1927)
 Charles "Stretch" Murphy (1929)
 John Wooden (1932)
 Norm Cottom (1934)
 Robert Kessler (1936)
 Jewell Young (1937, 1938)
 Terry Dischinger (1960, 1961, 1962)
 Dave Schellhase (1965)
 Rick Mount (1968, 1969, 1970)
 Joe Barry Carroll (1979)
 Keith Edmonson (1982)
 Glenn Robinson (1993, 1994)
 Willie Deane (2002)
 Carl Landry (2005)
 JaJuan Johnson (2011)
 Caleb Swanigan (2017)
 Carsen Edwards (2019)
 Zach Edey (2023)

Records

Record vs. Big Ten opponents
The Purdue Boilermakers lead the all-time series with every Big Ten opponent. (While Ohio State has vacated games from 1999 to 2002, Purdue still recognizes those games and keeps records accordingly.)

As of 02/19/2023.

Individual career records

 Points scored: Rick Mount (2,323)
 Points per game: Rick Mount (32.3)
 Assists: Bruce Parkinson (690)
 Rebounds: Joe Barry Carroll (1,148)
 Rebounds per game: Terry Dischinger (13.7)
 Blocks: Joe Barry Carroll (349)
 Blocks per game: Joe Barry Carroll (3.7)
 Steals: Chris Kramer (274)
 Steals per game: Chris Kramer (2.1)
 Starts: E'Twaun Moore (137)
 Field goal percentage: Steve Scheffler (.685)
 Free throw percentage: Jerry Sichting (.867)
 Free throws: Terry Dischinger (713)
 Three point field goals: Carsen Edwards (281)
 Three point percentage: Cuonzo Martin (.451)
 Games played: Dakota Mathias (141)
 Games won: E'Twaun Moore, JaJuan Johnson (107)
 Double-doubles: Terry Dischinger (58)
 20-20s: Caleb Swanigan (4)
 Triple-doubles: Joe Barry Carroll (1, 1977)
 Minutes played: E'Twaun Moore (4,517)
 Consecutive free throws made: Robbie Hummel (36)

Individual single-season records
 Points scored: Glenn Robinson (1,030, 1994)
 Points per game: Rick Mount (35.4, 1970)
 Assists: Bruce Parkinson (207, 1975)
 Assist/turnover ratio: PJ Thompson (4.04, 2016)
 Rebounds: Caleb Swanigan (436, 2017)
 Rebounds per game: Terry Dischinger (14.3, 1960)
 Blocks: Joe Barry Carroll (105, 1978)
 Blocks per game: Joe Barry Carroll (3.9, 1978)
 Steals: Brian Walker (88, 1979)
 Field goal percentage: Steve Scheffler (.708, 1988)
 Free throw percentage: Henry Ebershoff (.907, 1966)
 Free throws: Terry Dischinger (292, 1962)
 Three point percentage: Jaraan Cornell (.500, 1998)
 Three point field goals: Carsen Edwards (135, 2019)
 Double-doubles: Caleb Swanigan (28, 2017)
 Minutes played: Joe Barry Carroll (1,235, 1980)
 Games played: E'Twaun Moore, JaJuan Johnson, Keaton Grant, Marcus Green (37, 2009); Ryan Cline, Nojel Eastern, Carsen Edwards, Matt Haarms, Dakota Mathias, P.J. Thompson (37, 2018); Zach Edey, Trevion Williams, Sasha Stefanovic, Eric Hunter Jr., Isaiah Thompson, Ethan Morton (37, 2022)

Individual single-game records
 Points scored: Rick Mount (61, 1970, no three-point line)
 Assists: Bruce Parkinson (18, 1975)
 Rebounds: Carl McNulty (27, 1951)
 Blocks: Joe Barry Carroll (11, 1977)
 Steals: Ricky Hall (8, 1983)
 Three point field goals: Carsen Edwards (10, 2019)
 Three point field goal attempts: Carsen Edwards (19, 2019)
 Free throws: Terry Dischinger (21, 1961)
 Minutes played: Don Beck, Dennis Blind, Joe Sexson, Dan Thornburg (70, 1955)

Freshman season records
 Points: Russell Cross (540, 1981)
 Points in a game: Kyle Macy (38, 1976)
 Points per game: Russell Cross (16.9, 1981)
 Field goal percentage: Ian Stanback (.670, 1991)
 Rebounds: Caleb Swanigan (282, 2016)
 Rebounds per game: Caleb Swanigan (8.3, 2016)
 Rebounds in a game: Wayne Walls (18, 1975)
 Three point field goals: E'Twaun Moore (66, 2008)
 Three point field goals in a game: Fletcher Loyer (6, 2022)
 Three point percentage: Robbie Hummel (44.7, 2008)
 Blocks: Joe Barry Carroll (82, 1977)
 Steals: Chris Kramer (64, 2007)
 Steals in a game: Braden Smith (7, 2022)
 Assists: Bruce Parkinson (147, 1973), Braden Smith (147, 2023)
 Free throw percentage: Robbie Hummel (86.5, 2008)
 Games played: Lewis Jackson (36, 2009)
 Games started: Caleb Swanigan (34, 2016), Braden Smith & Fletcher Loyer (34, 2023)
 Double-Doubles: Caleb Swanigan (8, 2016)

1,000+ point scorers (55)
 Rick Mount (2,323)
 Joe Barry Carroll (2,175)
 E'Twaun Moore (2,136)
 Dave Schellhase (2,074)
 Troy Lewis (2,038)
 Terry Dischinger (1,979)
 Carsen Edwards (1,920)
 JaJuan Johnson (1,919)
 Walter Jordan (1,813)
 Robbie Hummel (1,772)
 Keith Edmonson (1,717)
 Glenn Robinson (1,706)
 Todd Mitchell (1,699)
 Chad Austin (1,694)
 Cuonzo Martin (1,666)
 Vincent Edwards (1,638)
 John Garrett (1,620)
 Jaraan Cornell (1,595)
 A. J. Hammons (1,593)
 Brian Cardinal (1,584)
 Isaac Haas (1,555)
 Mel McCants (1,554)
 Brad Miller (1,530)
 Russell Cross (1,529)
 Zach Edey (1,512)
 Eugene Parker (1,430)
 Trevion Williams (1,410)
 David Teague (1,378)
 Willie Deane (1,328)
 Mike Robinson (1,322)
 Terone Johnson (1,308)
 Frank Kendrick (1,269)
 Drake Morris (1,250)
 Bob Ford (1,244)
 Mel Garland (1,243)
 Bruce Parkinson (1,224)
 Carl Landry (1,175)
 Matt Waddell (1,170)
 Jerry Sichting (1,161)
 Steve Scheffler (1,155)
 Dakota Mathias (1,140)
 Herm Gilliam (1,118)
 Larry Weatherford (1,103)
 Joe Sexson (1,095)
 Steve Reid (1,084)
 Kenneth Lowe (1,079)
 Woody Austin (1,076)
 Bob Purkhiser (1,060)
 Billy Keller (1,056)
 Everette Stephens (1,044)
 Tony Jones (1,041)
 Keaton Grant (1,031)
 Wayne Walls (1,030)
 Dennis Blind (1,011)
 Rapheal Davis (1,009)

All data taken from

Boilermakers in the NBA, ABA, NBL, NBA G League (62)
Jaden Ivey (2022-present) Detroit Pistons
Trevion Williams (2022-present) Santa Cruz Warriors, Capital City Go-Go
Aaron Wheeler (2022-present) Greensboro Swarm, Windy City Bulls
 Dakota Mathias (2019–present) Texas Legends, Philadelphia 76ers, Memphis Grizzlies, Memphis Hustle
 Carsen Edwards (2019-2021) Boston Celtics, Maine Red Claws, Memphis Grizzlies, Salt Lake City Stars, Detroit Pistons
 Vincent Edwards (2018–2021) Houston Rockets, Canton Charge, Sacramento Kings, Oklahoma City Blue, Iowa Wolves
 Isaac Haas (2018–2020) Salt Lake City Stars
 Caleb Swanigan (2017–2020) Portland Trail Blazers, Canton Charge, Texas Legends, Sacramento Kings, Stockton Kings
 AJ Hammons (2016–2018) Dallas Mavericks, Texas Legends, Sioux Falls Skyforce
 Robbie Hummel (2012–2015) Minnesota Timberwolves, Denver Nuggets
 JaJuan Johnson (2011–2012) Boston Celtics, Houston Rockets
 E'Twaun Moore (2011–2021) Boston Celtics, Houston Rockets, Orlando Magic, Chicago Bulls, New Orleans Pelicans, Phoenix Suns, Orlando Magic
 Carl Landry (2007–2016) Houston Rockets, Sacramento Kings, New Orleans Hornets, Golden State Warriors, Sacramento Kings, Philadelphia 76ers
 Brian Cardinal (2000–2012) Detroit Pistons, Washington Wizards, Golden State Warriors, Memphis Grizzlies, Minnesota Timberwolves, New York Knicks, Dallas Mavericks
 Brad Miller (1998–2012) Charlotte Hornets, Indiana Pacers, Sacramento Kings, Chicago Bulls, Houston Rockets, Minnesota Timberwolves
 Willie Deane (2003) Washington Wizards
 Cuonzo Martin (1995–1997) Atlanta Hawks, Vancouver Grizzlies
 Glenn Robinson (1994–2005) Milwaukee Bucks, Atlanta Hawks, Philadelphia 76ers, San Antonio Spurs
 Jimmy Oliver (1991–1996) Cleveland Cavaliers, Boston Celtics
 Steve Scheffler (1990–1997) Charlotte Hornets, Sacramento Kings, Denver Nuggets, Seattle SuperSonics
 Everette Stephens (1988–1989, 1990–1991) Indiana Pacers, Milwaukee Bucks
 Todd Mitchell (1988–1989) San Antonio Spurs, Miami Heat
 Doug Lee (1991–1993, 1994–1995) New Jersey Nets, Sacramento Kings
 Tom Scheffler (1985–1986) Portland Trail Blazers
 Jim Rowinski (1984–1990) Utah Jazz, Detroit Pistons, Philadelphia 76ers, Miami Heat
 Russell Cross (1983–1984) Golden State Warriors
 Mike Scearce (1982) Indiana Pacers
 Keith Edmonson (1982–1984) Atlanta Hawks, Denver Nuggets, San Antonio Spurs
 Brian Walker (1981) Kansas City Kings
 Walter Jordan (1980–1981) Cleveland Cavaliers
 Arnette Hallman (1980) Boston Celtics
 Joe Barry Carroll (1980–1991) Golden State Warriors, Houston Rockets, New Jersey Nets, Denver Nuggets, Phoenix Suns
 Jerry Sichting (1980–1990) Indiana Pacers, Boston Celtics, Portland Trail Blazers, Milwaukee Bucks
 Kyle Macy (1980–1987) Phoenix Suns, Chicago Bulls, Indiana Pacers
 Eugene Parker (1978) San Antonio Spurs
 Bruce Parkinson (1976) Cleveland Cavaliers, Washington Bullets
 John Garrett (1975) Washington Bullets
 Frank Kendrick (1974–1975) Golden State Warriors
 William Franklin* (1972–1973, 1974–1976) Golden State Warriors, Virginia Squires, San Antonio Spurs
 Bob Ford* (1972–1973) Memphis Tams
 Larry Weatherford (1971) Chicago Bulls
 Rick Mount* (1970–1975) Indiana Pacers, Kentucky Colonels, Utah Stars, Memphis Sounds
 Herm Gilliam (1969–1977) Atlanta Hawks, Seattle SuperSonics, Portland Trail Blazers
 Billy Keller* (1969–1976) Indiana Pacers
 Dave Schellhase (1966–1968) Chicago Bulls
 George Grams (1966) Los Angeles Lakers
 Terry Dischinger (1962–1965, 1967–1973) Chicago Zephyrs, Detroit Pistons, Portland Trail Blazers
 Wilson Eison (1959–1960) Minneapolis Lakers
 Willie Merriweather (1959) St. Louis Hawks
 Joe Sexson (1956) New York Knicks
 Pete Brewster (1952) Milwaukee Hawks
 Carl McNulty (1952) Milwaukee Hawks
 Andy Butchko (1950) Minneapolis Lakers
 Howie Williams (1950) Minneapolis Lakers
 Paul Hoffman (1947–1948, 1949–1951, 1952–1955) Toronto Huskies, New York Knicks, Baltimore Bullets, Philadelphia Warriors
 Ed Ehlers (1947–1949) Boston Celtics
 Forest Weber** (1945–1947) Indianapolis Kautskys
 Jewell Young** (1938–1942, 1946) Indianapolis Kautskys
 Robert Kessler** (1937–1940) Indianapolis Kautskys
 John Wooden** (1932–1942) Indianapolis Kautskys
 Stretch Murphy** (1930–1934) Chicago Bruins, Indianapolis Kautskys
played in the ABA* NBL**

NBA All-Star selections (8)
 Terry Dischinger (1963, 1964, 1965)
 Joe Barry Carroll (1987)
 Glenn Robinson (2000, 2001)
 Brad Miller (2003, 2004)

First round draft picks (11)
Purdue is one of just fourteen schools in the nation that has produced more than one "No. 1 Overall"
NBA Draft pick.
 Ed "Bulbs" Ehlers (3rd, 1947)
 Dave Schellhase (10th, 1966)
 Herm Gilliam (8th, 1969)
 Kyle Macy * (22nd, 1979)
 Joe Barry Carroll (1st, 1980)
 Keith Edmonson(10th, 1982)
 Russell Cross (6th, 1983)
 Glenn Robinson (1st, 1994)
 JaJuan Johnson (27th, 2011)
 Caleb Swanigan (26th, 2017)
 Jaden Ivey (5th, 2022)
transferred after freshman season*

Second round draft picks (15)
 Terry Dischinger (1st, 1962)
 Arnette Hallman (23rd, 1980)
 Doug Lee (12th, 1987)
 Everette Stephens (6th, 1988)
 Todd Mitchell (18th, 1988)
 Steve Scheffler (12th, 1990)
 Jimmy Oliver (12th, 1991)
 Cuonzo Martin (28th, 1995)
 Brian Cardinal (15th, 2000)
 Carl Landry (1st, 2007)
 E'Twaun Moore (25th, 2011)
 Robbie Hummel (28th, 2012)
 AJ Hammons (16th, 2016)
 Vince Edwards (22nd, 2018)
 Carsen Edwards (3rd, 2019)

NBA Rookie of the Year (2)
 Paul Hoffman, Baltimore Bullets* (1948)
 Terry Dischinger, Chicago Zephyrs (1963)

NBL Rookie of the Year (2)
 Robert Kessler** Indianapolis Kautskys (1938)
 Jewell Young** Indianapolis Kautskys (1939)

NBA All-Rookie Team (3)
 Terry Dischinger (1963)
 Joe Barry Carroll (1981)
 Glenn Robinson (1995)

NBA All-Rookie Second Team
 Carl Landry (2008)

NBA, ABA, BAA Champions (8)

BAA
 Paul Hoffman (1948) Baltimore Bullets

ABA
 Billy Keller (1970, 1972, 1973) Indiana Pacers
 Rick Mount (1972) Indiana Pacers

NBA
 Frank Kendrick (1975) Golden State Warriors
 Herm Gilliam (1977) Portland Trail Blazers
 Jerry Sichting (1986) Boston Celtics
 Glenn Robinson, (2005) San Antonio Spurs
 Brian Cardinal, (2011) Dallas Mavericks

Head coaches (5)
 Doxie Moore (1946–1947) Sheboygan Red Skins (1950) Anderson Packers (1951–1952) Milwaukee Hawks
 Fred Schaus (1960–1967) Los Angeles Lakers
 Terry Dischinger (1971) Detroit Pistons
 Frank Kendrick (1999–2000) Gary Steelheads*

CBA *

Assistant coaches (4)
 Lee Rose (1986–1988) San Antonio Spurs (1988–1989) New Jersey Nets (1991–1992) Milwaukee Bucks (1996–2001) Charlotte Hornets
 Jerry Sichting (1995–2005, 2008–2010) Minnesota Timberwolves, (2010–2011) Golden State Warriors, (2012–2013) Washington Wizards, (2013–2016) Phoenix Suns, (2016–2018) New York Knicks
 Gene Keady (2005–2006) Toronto Raptors
 Micah Shrewsberry (2013–2019) Boston Celtics

Executives (2)
 Paul Hoffman (1963–1965), General Manager Baltimore Bullets
 Fred Schaus (1967–1972) General Manager Los Angeles Lakers

Boilermakers in international basketball
 Chris Kramer (born 1988), in the Liga ACB
 JaJuan Johnson (born 1989), in the LNB Pro A
 Kendall Stephens* (born 1994) in the Latvian-Estonian Basketball League
 Isaac Haas (born in 1995), in the Chinese Basketball Association
 Vincent Edwards (born 1996) in the LNB Pro A
 Matt Haarms* (born in 1997), in the Basketball Bundesliga
 Carsen Edwards (born 1998) in the Basketbol Süper Ligi
 Sasha Stefanovic (born 1998) in the ABA League

transferred from Purdue*

Boilermakers on USA Basketball rosters

U.S. Olympic Team
 Glenn Robinson (1996)^
 Terry Dischinger (1960)
 Howard Williams (1952)

^ – replaced due to injury

U.S. Senior National Team
 Brad Miller (2006–08)

FIBA World Championships
 Brad Miller (2006, 1998)
 Jimmy Oliver (1998)
 Eugene Parker (1978)

FIBA 3x3 World Cup
 Robbie Hummel (2019)

Pan-Am Games
Traditional
 Chuckie White (1995)
 Bruce Parkinson (1975)
 Bob Ford (1971)

3x3 Tournament
 Jonathan Octeus (2019)

World University Games

 2017–18 American Roster (2017)^
 Robbie Hummel (2009)
 Steven Scheffler & Tony Jones (1989)
 Troy Lewis (1987)
 Walter Jordan (1977)
 Bob Ford (1970)

^ - During the 2017 World University Games, Purdue was selected to represent Team USA.

FIBA U21 World Championship

 Brad Miller, Chad Austin & Brian Cardinal (1997)

FIBA U19 World Championship
 Caleb Furst (2021)
 Jaden Ivey (2021)
 Trevion Williams (2019)
 Carsen Edwards (2017)
 Caleb Swanigan (2015)

FIBA U17 World Championship

 Caleb Swanigan (2014)

Goodwill Games
 Brian Cardinal (1998)

Jones Cup
 Troy Lewis & Todd Mitchell (1985)

Intercontinental Cup
 Bruce Parkinson (1975)

Spartakiade
 Joe Barry Carroll & Brian Walker (1979)

World Invitational tournament
 Joe Barry Carroll (1978)

Early Season Tournament Championships
Paradise Jam tournament (2009)
Hall of Fame Tip Off Naismith Bracket (2015)
Cancún Challenge Riviera Division (2016)
Hall of Fame Tip Off (2021)
Phil Knight Legacy Tournament (2022)

Radio network affiliates

References

External links
 

 
Basketball teams established in 1896
1896 establishments in Indiana